The Bridge for Kids is a proposed bridge across the Carbon River in Orting, Washington, about a mile upstream of where it joins the Puyallup River. , the $40 million bridge was still in the planning phase.

Background

Lahars from the Cascade Volcanoes are historically common. Orting is situated in the floodplain of the Puyallup River and on top of the debris field of past lahars from Mount Rainier, including the Osceola Mudflow. The Osceola Mudflow followed an eruption 5,600 years ago that left a horseshoe-shaped crater in Mount Rainier comparable to that of the 1980 eruption of Mount Saint Helens and deposited debris across a  area as far as Commencement Bay on Puget Sound.

The current lahar risk is considered extremely high in Orting, with an estimated one in seven chance of a catastrophic event in a resident's lifetime. Land use planning and emergency management in Orting differs from that in surrounding Pierce County, allowing development and location of schools in this area.

The Mount Rainier Volcano Lahar Warning System has existed since 2000 to give residents in high-risk areas some advance warning of an approaching lahar, but evacuation drills in Orting have shown that motorized transportation (school buses) is not a viable option for removing students from the lahar zone due to road congestion and time factors.

Evacuation planning at Orting schools started in 1995, and it was then that the insufficiency of infrastructure began to be an issue. , drills were showing student evacuation times via an existing  foot route to still be in excess of the notification window.

Bridge design
A yearlong design process was started by Pierce County in consultation with Washington State Department of Transportation and other agencies and a citizens' group in January, 2009, after considering other evacuation means such as pathways and a tunnel under the river. Orting is estimated to have a 40 minute evacuation window after the Mount Rainier Volcano Lahar Warning System is activated.

Preliminary design renderings from 2014 show a pedestrian suspension bridge with stairsteps approaching a lower pier, and another pier  higher on a ridge above Orting, near the community of Tehaleh. Part of the bridge deck would contain stairs and lie at a 40% slope.

See also

References

External links
Bridge For Kids organization, Graham, Washington

Proposed bridges in the United States
Pedestrian bridges in Washington (state)
Bridges in Pierce County, Washington
Bridges over the Puyallup River
Suspension bridges in Washington (state)